Nazar Albaryan (4 May 1943 – March 2021) was an Armenian wrestler. He competed for the Soviet Union in the men's freestyle 52 kg at the 1968 Summer Olympics. His death was announced in March 2021.

Career
Albaryan finished 4th in the Men's Freestyle 52kg category at the 1968 Summer Olympic Games in Mexico City, representing the Soviet Union.

References

External links

1943 births
2021 deaths
Armenian male sport wrestlers
Soviet male sport wrestlers
Olympic wrestlers of the Soviet Union
Wrestlers at the 1968 Summer Olympics
People from Aragatsotn Province
Soviet Armenians